The Howard R. Young Correctional Institution, colloquially known as Gander Hill Prison, is a state prison for male inmates in Wilmington, New Castle County, Delaware, owned and operated by the Delaware Department of Correction.   The facility first opened in 1982, and houses 1500 inmates.

References

Prisons in Delaware
Buildings and structures in Wilmington, Delaware
1982 establishments in Delaware